Mehdi Lehaire (born 22 January 2000) is a Belgian professional footballer who plays as a midfielder for Polish club Resovia, on loan from Miedź Legnica.

Club career
He made his debut for the main squad of Lierse on 19 May 2017 in the Europa League play-off game against Standard Liège as a 57th-minute substitute for Othman Boussaid.

He made his Eerste Divisie debut for Jong FC Utrecht on 17 August 2018 in a game against Go Ahead Eagles as a 58th-minute substitute for Rayan El Azrak.

On 20 August 2020, he signed with Polish club Miedź Legnica and was initially assigned to the second team in the III liga. By mid-October, he was moved to the first team and made his I liga debut on 16 October 2020.

On 16 January 2023, he joined I liga side Resovia on loan until the end of the season.

Personal life
Born in Belgium, Lehaire is of Moroccan descent.

Honours
Miedź Legnica
I liga: 2021–22

References

2000 births
People from Mouscron
Footballers from Hainaut (province)
Living people
Belgian footballers
Belgian sportspeople of Moroccan descent
Association football midfielders
Lierse S.K. players
Jong FC Utrecht players
Miedź Legnica players
Resovia (football) players
Belgian Pro League players
Eerste Divisie players
Ekstraklasa players
I liga players
III liga players
Belgian expatriate footballers
Belgian expatriate sportspeople in the Netherlands
Expatriate footballers in the Netherlands
Belgian expatriate sportspeople in Poland
Expatriate footballers in Poland